Shannon O'Connell (born 20 January 1983), nicknamed Shotgun Shannon is an Australian professional boxer who held the WBF female featherweight world title in 2013 and is known as The Queen of Australian Boxing. As of September, 2022 she is the mandatory challenger for the IBF bantamweight world championship, number 1 ranked contender for the WBA and IBO bantamweight world championships,  and is currently the number 3 ranked women's bantamweight in the world by Boxrec.

She is managed by Glen Jennings (Tim Tszyu, Nikita Tszyu, Kostya Tszyu) and No Limit Boxing.

Early life

O'Connell was born on 20 January, 1983 in Adelaide, South Australia. At the age of 2 her father Kevin O'Connell passed away in a speedway accident. As a result of the loss of her father, her mother Lynda became deeply troubled and much of Shannon's early life was marred by abuse and drug-use. She took up boxing at the age of 20 to rehabilitate a back injury she suffered playing netball. Her first coach was Terry Fox, an Adelaide boxer from the 1970s that competed in speedway competitions against her father.

Amateur career

O'Connell had a successful amateur career winning a national championship in her fifth fight. After a tournament in Tonga she met Brisbane trainer Chris McCullen, notably a trainer of former world champion Anthony Mundine and was persuaded to relocate to Queensland to continue her career.

Professional career

O'Connell made her professional debut on 15 Dec, 2011 winning by Technical Knockout in round 3. In her second fight she fought for the Queensland state female bantamweight title and lost. After winning her next six fights (including the Queensland state female featherweight title) O'Connell fought South Korean Choi Hyun-mi for the WBA world female featherweight title, losing by unanimous decision to the hometown fighter in Seoul, South Korea. 

On 29 June, 2013 O'Connell travelled to Secunda South Africa, to face Gabisile Tshabalala for the vacant WBF female featherweight title. O'Connell won the fight via seventh round knockout winning her first world championship in just her 10th fight before stepping up in weight to take on the bigger and more experienced Diana Prazak for the WBC female super featherweight title. O'Connell lost the fight by 5th round TKO.

On 6 July, 2014, O'Connell won the vacant WIBA world super bantamweight title over Brownyn Wilie by unanimous decision.

On 16 Jun, 2017, O'Connell travelled to Argentina to take on experienced veteran Marcela Acuña for the IBF world female super bantamweight title. She lost by unanimous decision to the hometown fighter.

O'Connell has experienced a career resurgence in recent times and is currently on an 8 fight win streak as of September 2022, including wins over former Commonwealth Games medalist Taylah Robertson and current world champion Cherneka Johnson both in 2021. In December 2021 she was named "Female Fighter of the Year" by The Inner Sanctum. As of September, 2022 O'Connell multiple titles including the Commonwealth Boxing Council Bantamweight Title and WBA Gold World Bantamweight Title. 

In 2022 O'Connell was forced to undergo shoulder surgery that threatened her career. After undergoing surgery two times she returned to action in June against Sarah Higginson, with O'Connell winning by first round knockout. In July 2022 she was named the mandatory challenger for the IBF world bantamweight title, held by fellow Australian Ebanie Bridges. On August 25, 2022, the IBF declined Bridges' request to delay the fight and ordered Bridges' promoter Eddie Hearn and Matchroom Boxing to enter negotiations with O'Connell's Australian promoter No Limit Boxing to schedule a date for the fight. The two parties were unable to negotiate terms by September and as a result the fight was sent to purse bids which was won by Matchroom Boxing.

Personal life

O'Connell has three children and resides in Slacks Creek, south of Brisbane, Queensland. She was named the 2021 City of Logan "Sportswoman of the Year" and founded a gym in Slacks Creek named Shotgun Boxing and Fitness.

Professional boxing record

References

External links

1983 births
Living people
Sportspeople from Adelaide
Australian women boxers
Featherweight boxers
Boxers from Brisbane